The Fargo-Moorhead Jets were a Junior A ice hockey team in the North American Hockey League's central division, and played out of John E. Carlson Coliseum in Fargo, North Dakota. Their inaugural season was 2003–2004 and they folded and were replaced by the Fargo Force of the USHL after the 2007–2008 season.

External links
Fargo-Moorhead Jets website

Defunct North American Hockey League teams
Sports in Fargo, North Dakota
Ice hockey teams in North Dakota
Ice hockey clubs established in 2003
Ice hockey clubs disestablished in 2008
Defunct sports teams in North Dakota
2003 establishments in North Dakota
2008 disestablishments in North Dakota